Derek Philip Fraser Turnbull  (5 December 1926 – 2 November 2006) was a New Zealand middle- and long-distance runner. He took up Masters athletics at the age of 40, and went on to set 25 Masters Athletics World Records.

Early life
Born in Waikaka, Southland, 28 km northeast of Gore, on 5 December 1926, Turnbull was educated at Southland Boys' High School. He went on to study at Massey Agricultural College, gaining a Diploma of Agriculture with honours. He became a farmer, and owned and farmed 105 hectares at Tussock Creek, 30 km north of Invercargill from about 1980.

Athletics
While at Massey, Turnbull was awarded New Zealand University blues in cross country and athletics. He began competing in Masters athletics events when he was 40 years old, going on to win 28 gold medals at world veteran track and field championships.

Over his career, Turnbull set 25 Masters Athletics World Records across various age categories and events. In 1992, he set six world records in the 65–69 age category as well as two further world best times for the year. , records set by Turnbull that still stand are:

Three of Turnbull's notable marathons include:
 1987 Alaska Marathon, winning the men's 60+ category in a time of 2:38:46, his personal best for the distance
 1990 New York Marathon, winning the men's 60-69 category in a time of 2:41:21
 1992 London Marathon, winning the M 65 category in 2:41:57.

In the 1988 Queen's Birthday Honours, Turnbull was awarded the Queen's Service Medal for community service. His story was documented in the book The Fastest Old Man in the World by Vince Boyle, published in 2006, and later made into a 30-minute film of the same name.

Later life and death
Turnbull suffered a mild stroke in 2001. He died on 2 November 2006, and was survived by his wife, Pat, with whom he had six children.

References

1926 births
2006 deaths
Sportspeople from Southland, New Zealand
People educated at Southland Boys' High School
Massey University alumni
New Zealand male middle-distance runners
New Zealand male long-distance runners
World record holders in masters athletics
New Zealand masters athletes
Recipients of the Queen's Service Medal